Connellia is a genus of plants in the family Bromeliaceae. The genus name is for Frederick Vavasour McConnell, English ornithologist and biologist (1868-1914). There are 6 known species, all native to the Guyana Highlands of Guyana and Venezuela.

Species
Connellia augustae (R. Schomburgk) N.E. Brown 
Connellia caricifolia L.B. Smith 
Connellia nahoumii Leme 
Connellia nutans L.B. Smith 
Connellia quelchii N.E. Brown 
Connellia varadarajanii L.B. Smith & Steyermark

References

External links
BSI Genera Gallery photos

 
Bromeliaceae genera
Flora of Guyana
Taxa named by N. E. Brown